The International Baptist Network (IBN) is a Baptist organization of churches.

History
The Network was founded in 2005 by American Fundamentalist Baptists.

References

Christian organizations established in 2004
Baptist organizations established in the 21st century
Protestant denominations established in the 21st century